Charles David "Fritz" Hamburg is an American college baseball coach and former catcher. Hamburg is the head coach of the Saint Joseph's Hawks baseball team.

Playing career
Hamburg attended The Hill School in Pottstown, Pennsylvania. After graduating from The Hill School, Hamburg enrolled at Virginia Polytechnic Institute and State University where he would play for the Virginia Tech Hokies baseball team. After two years at Virginia Tech, Hamburg transferred to Ithaca College. While at Ithaca, he was named a Third Team All-American in 1988, while leading the Bombers to a National Championship.

Following graduation, Hamburg signed with the Philadelphia Phillies and was assigned to the Spartanburg Phillies. Hamburg had a .194 batting average, .358 on base percentage, seven doubles, and 7 RBIs.

Coaching career
Hamburg began his coaching career as an assistant for the Cornell Big Red baseball team. After two years, Hamburg moved on to be an assistant at New Mexico State and Cal Poly Pomona. Hamburg spent the 1996 season at Georgia before rejoining his alma mater Ithaca as an assistant from 1997 to 2000. Hamburg then moved on to being an assistant for the Army Black Knights baseball team. In 2007, he was named the ABCA/Baseball America Assistant Coach of the Year.

On August 26, 2008, Hamburg was named the head coach of the Saint Joseph's Hawks baseball program.

Head coaching record

See also
 List of current NCAA Division I baseball coaches

References

External links
Saint Joseph's Hawks bio

Living people
1966 births
Baseball catchers
The Hill School alumni
Virginia Tech Hokies baseball players
Ithaca Bombers baseball players
Spartanburg Phillies players
Cornell Big Red baseball coaches
New Mexico State Aggies baseball coaches
Cal Poly Pomona Broncos baseball coaches
Georgia Bulldogs baseball coaches
Ithaca Bombers baseball coaches
Army Black Knights baseball coaches
Saint Joseph's Hawks baseball coaches